Clube Recreativo de Candoso  is a sports club based in the village of São Martinho de Candoso, Portugal. In 2019 the futsal team of Candoso won the Portuguese II Divisão Futsal achieving the promotion to the first tier Liga Sport Zone for the first time in its history.

References

External links
 Official Facebook page
 Zerozero

Futsal clubs in Portugal